The Damned of the Sea is a 2008 documentary film.

Synopsis 
In Dakhla (in the southernmost part of Morocco), one of the richest fishing regions in the world, hundreds of Moroccan fishermen, pushed by the increasing shortage of resources in the north, huddle together in tents sprayed by the ocean. However, their quest for a miraculous catch has revealed itself to be a tragic trap. As they have no licenses, they are sentenced to remain a few yards from the shoreline and catch what they can, while foreign trawlers equipped with the latest in sonar technology, captures the sea's riches to export them to other continents.

References

External links 

2008 films
Belgian documentary films
French documentary films
Moroccan documentary films
2008 documentary films
Documentary films about fishing
2000s French films